The 52nd Tour of Flanders cycling classic was held on Saturday, 30 March 1968. The race was won by Belgian sprinter Walter Godefroot ahead of Guido Reybrouck, who was being led out by Eddy Merckx. After the race, Reybrouck tested positive for doping and Rudi Altig was promoted to second place. 82 of 175 riders finished.

Route
The race started in Ghent and finished in Gentbrugge – covering 249 km. There were four categorized climbs:
 Kwaremont
 Kloosterstraat (Geraardsbergen)
 Valkenberg
 Kasteelstraat

Results

References

External links
 Video of the 1968 Tour of Flanders  on Sporza (in Dutch)

Tour of Flanders
1968 in road cycling
1968 in Belgian sport
1968 Super Prestige Pernod